Growing Up Straight may refer to:

 Growing Up Straight (Wyden and Wyden book), 1968
 Growing Up Straight: What Every Family Should Know About Homosexuality, a 1982 book by George Rekers